Kryachkovo is a rural locality (a village) in Malyginskoye Rural Settlement, Kovrovsky District, Vladimir Oblast, Russia. The population was 34 as of 2010.

Geography 
Kryachkovo is located 13 km north of Kovrov (the district's administrative centre) by road. Gigant is the nearest rural locality.

References 

Rural localities in Kovrovsky District